The men's tournament in volleyball at the 2012 Summer Olympics was the 13th edition of the event at the Summer Olympics, organised by the world's governing body, the FIVB, in conjunction with the IOC. It was held in London, United Kingdom from 29 July to 12 August 2012.

Russia won the gold medal in a 3–2 victory against Brazil.

Qualification

Pools composition
Teams were seeded following the serpentine system according to their FIVB World Ranking as of 4 January 2012. FIVB reserved the right to seed the hosts as head of pool A regardless of the World Ranking. Rankings are shown in brackets except the hosts who ranked 92nd.

Rosters

Venue

Pool standing procedure
 Match points
 Number of matches won
 Sets ratio
 Points ratio
 Result of the last match between the tied teams

Match won 3–0 or 3–1: 3 match points for the winner, 0 match points for the loser
Match won 3–2: 2 match points for the winner, 1 match point for the loser

Preliminary round
All times are British Summer Time (UTC+01:00).
The top four teams in each pool qualified for the quarterfinals.

Pool A

Pool B

Final round
All times are British Summer Time (UTC+01:00).
The first ranked teams of both pools played against the fourth ranked teams of the other pool. The second ranked teams faced the second or third ranked teams of the other pool, determined by drawing of lots. The drawing of lots was held after the last match in the preliminary round.

Quarterfinals

Semifinals

Bronze medal match

Gold medal match

Final standing

Medalists

Awards

Most Valuable Player
 Murilo Endres
Best Scorer
 Maksim Mikhaylov
Best Spiker
 Maksim Mikhaylov
Best Blocker
 Max Gunthor
Best Server
 Cristian Savani

Best Digger
 Teodor Salparov
Best Setter
 Georgi Bratoev
Best Receiver
 Krzysztof Ignaczak
Best Libero
 Markus Steuerwald

See also
Volleyball at the 2012 Summer Olympics – Women's tournament

References

External links
Official website
Final Standing
Awards
Statistics
Results at Todor66.com
Results at Sports123.com

Men's indoor
Olympics
Men's events at the 2012 Summer Olympics